Radio Islam was a Swedish Islamic radio channel, now a website. The EU's racism monitoring organization has called it "one of the most radical right-wing antisemitic homepages on the net".

Mission
The Radio Islam website states that it "is working to promote better relations between the West and the Muslim World". It also states that it is "against racism of all forms, against all kinds of discrimination of people based on their colour of skin, faith or ethnical background". As a "consequence", Radio Islam states that it is "against Jewish racism towards non-Jews". It asserts that "World Jewish Zionism" constitutes "the last racist ideology still surviving" and that Israel is "the last outpost of Apartheid in the World", which, "by its mere existence" demonstrates "a complete defiance to all international laws, rules and principles".  As well, it insists that "the open racism manifested in the Jewish State is a violation of all ethics and morals known to Man".

History
In September 1973 Ahmed Rami, a former Moroccan army officer, came to Sweden from Paris. He gained political asylum by claiming that he took part in the failed coup attempt against King Hassan II in August 1972.  In 1987 Rami began using a public access Swedish radio station to broadcast "Radio Islam", ostensibly a public relations program for Sweden's Muslims. However, the content of the shows focused on Jews, and the station was accused of being a vehicle for anti-Semitism.  In 1990 Rami was sentenced to 6 months in prison for hate speech, and Radio Islam's transmission permit was revoked for a year. The station resumed broadcasting in 1991 under the direction of the Swedish Nazi David Janzon; however, in 1993 Janzon was convicted of the same crime. Radio Islam was off the air from 1993 to 1995, but the program returned in 1996 under Rami's direction, the same year that he established the Radio Islam website. Rami was again convicted and fined by the Swedish court in October 2000. Rami has been investigated for hate crimes in France and Sweden for his role in maintaining the Radio Islam website. The latest investigation ended in 2004 when the Swedish prosecutor was unable to prove that Rami was responsible for the content.

Contents
The focus of the Radio Islam website is the alleged influence of Jews and "Zionists" on society, and in particular on politics in Western countries and in the Middle East. It proposes that there are conspiracies of Jews/"Zionists" to control Western society and oppress and/or kill Muslims (among other groups), and that these actions are a historic feature of both Jews and Judaism (which it describes as the Jewish "Religion").  It considers the Holocaust to be a fraudulent "Zionist" attempt to turn attention away from "the ongoing Zionist war waged against the peoples of Palestine and the Middle East".  Major topics of the website include "Zionist massacres", "Zionist terrorism", "Jewish Power", "Jewish racism", "Jewish racism against Blacks", Holocaust denial, "Jewish hypocrisy", "Jewish propaganda", "Jewish war against Iraq", and "Jewish war against Lebanon".  Radio Islam's online library contains several complete works, including The Protocols of the Elders of Zion (which Encyclopædia Britannica describes as a "fraudulent document that served as a pretext and rationale for anti-Semitism in the early 20th century"), Adolf Hitler's Mein Kampf, Henry Ford's The International Jew, Arthur Koestler's The Thirteenth Tribe, Israel Shahak's Jewish History, Jewish Religion, and Roger Garaudy's The Founding Myths of Israeli Politics.

Radio Islam and Ahmed Rami had ties to book releases and meetings with Nationalsocialistisk front (NSF), and Radio Islam as of 2018 still promoted books sold by this Swedish nazi party' s online shop. Rami also wrote texts for some of the nazi party's books.

Holocaust denial

Radio Islam denies that the Holocaust took place. Their website describes the Holocaust as a "hoax" fabricated by Zionists, as a pretext for the establishment of an Israeli state.

Criticism
A 2003 report commissioned by the European Monitoring Centre on Racism and Xenophobia described Radio Islam as "one of the most radical right wing anti-Semitic homepages on the net with close links to radical Islam groups", one of a number of "racist and xenophobic sites" which "utilis[e] the denial of the Holocaust as a component of anti-Semitic agitation" and "make use of the entire spectrum of anti-Semitic stereotypes". The Southern Poverty Law Center has described Radio Islam as "a Stockholm-based neo-Nazi propaganda outfit" which "contains a treasure trove of antisemitica" and Ahmed Rami as a "key IHR (Institute for Historical Review) ally" and "a key promoter of anti-Semitism worldwide". The Stephen Roth Institute lists it among a number of "Holocaust denial and/or neo-Nazi pages". The Anti-Defamation League notes that the site "promotes a myriad of anti-Semitic works", and states that it "demonstrates the implicit connection between Holocaust denial and other forms of anti-Semitism". Per Ahlmark, co-founder of the Swedish Committee Against Antisemitism, has described Radio Islam as "the most vicious anti-Jewish campaign in Europe since the Third Reich."

Namesake Confusion
It bears no relationship to RadioIslam.com, a website live streaming a daily Muslim talk radio program on public affairs. Radio Islam airs in Chicago on WCEV 1450 AM every day from 6-7 PM CST. It is produced by Sound Vision Foundation. Its executive producer is Abdul Malik Mujahid who also chairs the board of Parliament of the World's Religions.
There are also two other websites bearing the "radioislam" address: radioislam.org.za and radioislam.org.mw, which are based in South Africa and Malawi respectively, and cover matters relating to Islam from their own perspectives. The former location of the website (and previously radio station) referred to on this page - radioislam.org - has been changed to islam-radio.net, presumably to avoid confusion.

Footnotes
 "Reflections on Combating Anti-Semitism," in Yaffa Zilbershats, ed., The Rising Tide of Anti-Semitism (Ramat Gan: Bar-Ilan University, n.d.), pp. 59–66.

References

External links
 Radio Islam website
 Ahmed Rami's personal website, and his own publishing company Kultur Förlag
 Radio Islam - different website
 Holocaust Denial: Ahmed Rami. Anti-Defamation League
 Between Friends: U.S. Holocaust deniers help unite neo-Nazis, Arab extremists Southern Poverty Law Center
 Muslim anti-Semitism: A clear and present danger. (pdf)

Anti-Zionism in Sweden
Conspiracist media
Antisemitic publications
Radio in Sweden
Islam and antisemitism
Holocaust-denying websites
Holocaust denial in Sweden
Propaganda in Sweden
Internet radio stations
Islamism in Sweden
Islamic radio stations
Defunct mass media in Sweden
Radio stations established in 1987
Radio stations disestablished in 1996